Polynoncus gemmingeri is a species of hide beetle in the subfamily Omorginae found across South America, from Panama to Argentina.

References

gemmingeri
Beetles described in 1872